Phyllostachys edulis, the  bamboo, or tortoise-shell bamboo, or ,, is a temperate species of giant timber bamboo native to China and Taiwan and naturalised elsewhere, including Japan where it is widely distributed from south of Hokkaido to Kagoshima. The edulis part of the Latin name refers to its edible shoots. This particular species of bamboo is the most common species used in the bamboo textile industry of China and other countries, for the production of rayon. Moso is less cold-hardy than many phyllostachys, surviving at a reduced height down to 5 degrees Fahrenheit (-15°C).

Ecology 
Phyllostachys edulis spreads using both asexual and sexual reproduction. The most common and well known mode for this plant is asexual reproduction. This occurs when the plant sends up new culms from underground rhizomes. In mature individuals, the culms in young plants grow taller and wider in diameter as the general plant reaches maturity, but once the individual culm stops growing it will not grow again. P. edulis also flowers and produces seed, and it does so every half century or so, but it has a sporadic flowering nature rather than the synchronous blooming seen in some other bamboo species. The seeds fall from the mature culms in the hundreds of thousands and are quick to germinate. Mice, field rats and other rodents take notice of the bounty of seed, this results in the loss of many of the seeds, but within a few weeks the surviving few seeds would have germinated (see Predator satiation).

Polyporus phyllostachydis (Sotome, T. Hatt. & Kakish.), is a fungus species known from Japan, that grows on the ground on the living or dead roots of the bamboo.

Cultivation

Cultivars 
Cultivars include:
 Phyllostachys edulis 'Bicolor'
 Phyllostachys edulis 'Kikko' or 'Kikko-Chiku' (Syn.: Phyllostachys edulis var. heterocycla)
 Phyllostachys edulis 'Subconvexa' (Syn.: Phyllostachys heterocycla f. subconvexa, Phyllostachys pubescens 'Subconvexa')
 Phyllostachys edulis 'Nabeshimana', (Syn.: Phyllostachys heterocycla f. nabeshimana, Phyllostachys pubescens f. luteosulcata)

Cultivation in the United States 
In 2016 OnlyMoso USA initiated large scale commercial farming of Phyllostachys edulis in the United States, in the state of Florida, becoming the first entity to grow  bamboo from seedlings in large scale in the US, including the development of nurseries to ensure a constant supply of viable plants for bamboo farmers.

Biochemistry 
Compounds isolated from P. edulis include:
 Hydroxycinnamic acids
 p-coumaric acid
 caffeic acid
 ferulic acid
 Chlorogenic acids
 chlorogenic acid (3-(3,4-dihydroxycinnamoyl)quinic acid)
 3-O-(3'-methylcaffeoyl)quinic acid
 5-O-caffeoyl-4-methylquinic acid
 3-O-caffeoyl-1-methylquinic acid (exact mass : 368.110732).
 Flavones
 tricin
 7-O-methyltricin
 Glycosylated flavones
 orientin
 isoorientin
 vitexin
 isovitexin
 5,7,3'-trihydroxy-6-C-β-D-digitoxopyranosyl-4'-O-β-D-glucopyranosyl flavonoside
 5,3',4'-trihydroxy-7-O-β-D-glucopyranosyl flavonoside
 5,4'-dihydroxy-3',5',-dimethoxy-7-O-β-D-glucopyranosyl flavonoside
 5,7,3',4'-trihydroxy-6-C-(α-L-rhamnopyranosyl-[1→6])-β-D-glucopyranosyl flavonoside

References

External links 

edulis
Flora of China
Flora of Taiwan
Flora of Japan
Taxa named by Élie-Abel Carrière